A retinaculum (plural retinacula) is a band of thickened deep fascia around tendons that holds them in place. It is not part of any muscle.  Its function is mostly to stabilize a tendon. The term retinaculum is New Latin, derived from the Latin verb retinere (to retain). Specific retinacula include:

 In the wrist:
 Flexor retinaculum of the hand
 Extensor retinaculum of the hand
 In the ankle:
 Flexor retinaculum of foot
 Superior extensor retinaculum of foot
 Inferior extensor retinaculum of foot
 Superior fibular retinaculum
 Inferior fibular retinaculum
 In the knee:
 Lateral retinaculum
 Medial patellar retinaculum

References

Tendons